Daniel Gritsch (born 14 March 1954) is an Austrian ice hockey player. He competed in the men's tournament at the 1976 Winter Olympics.

References

1954 births
Living people
Austrian ice hockey players
Olympic ice hockey players of Austria
Ice hockey players at the 1976 Winter Olympics
Sportspeople from Innsbruck
20th-century Austrian people